AAA 10th Anniversary Best is the tenth studio album by Japanese music group AAA, released on September 16, 2015 alongside their eighth single of 2015 "Aishiteru no ni, Aisenai". The album is divided into three separate discs: the first two discs are a greatest hits compilation of hits songs from debut to 2014, while the third disc consists of new material released in 2015.

Soon after release the album rose to the top of Oricon's daily album rankings, also claiming the top spot on the proceeding 28 September 2015 weekly Oricon Albums Chart.

The album was released in light of commemorating AAA's tenth anniversary. During the first seven months of 2015, AAA released a single per month from January to July, which respectively became the first seven tracks of disc 3.

Track listing

Total CD 1 Length = 

Total CD 2 Length = 

NOTE: All rap lyrics by Mitsuhiro Hidaka (SKY-HI)

Total CD 3 Length =

Charts

Cover images

References

2015 albums
AAA (band) albums
Avex Group albums